The names used for some major European cities differ in different European and sometimes non-European languages.  In some countries where there are two or more languages spoken, such as Belgium or Switzerland, dual forms may be used within the city itself, for example on signage. This is also the case in Ireland, despite a low level of actual usage of the Irish language.  In other cases where a regional language is officially recognised, that form of the name may be used in the region, but not nationally. Examples include the Welsh language in Wales in the United Kingdom, and parts of Italy and Spain.

There is a slow trend to return to the local name, which has been going on for a long time. In English Livorno is now used, the old English form of Leghorn having become antiquated at least a century ago. In some cases, such as the replacement of Danzig with Gdansk, the official name has been changed more recently. Since 1995, the government of Ukraine has encouraged the use of Kyiv rather than Kiev.

Q

R

S

T

References